Sigfred Christian Emil Sørensen (16 March 1907 – 19 September 1962) was a Danish rower. He competed at the 1928 Summer Olympics in Amsterdam with the men's eight where they were eliminated in round two. He rowed with his brother Bernhardt Møller Sørensen.

References

1907 births
1962 deaths
Danish male rowers
Olympic rowers of Denmark
Rowers at the 1928 Summer Olympics
Rowers from Copenhagen
European Rowing Championships medalists